Maschi e Altri is the ninth album by Gianna Nannini. It is her first compilation album, and it was released in 1987 in South America, South Korea, Israel, South Africa and Australia. It includes some of her most successful singles, including "Profumo" (who topped the Greek charts), "I Maschi" (who debuted at the "World Popular Song Festival” in Tokyo) and "Avventura" (who became popular when Philips used it for a commercial advertising Metalalkaline batteries).
Nannini did not tour to promote the album but she took part in a concert at the Schauspielhaus in Hamburg on May 1, 1987, where she performed a selection of songs by Bertoldt Brecht and Kurt Weill alongside Sting and Jack Bruce.

Track listing
"I Maschi" 
"Profumo" (Nannini-Pianigiani/Nannini) - 3:50
"America" (Gianna Nannini) – 4:20
"Ragazzo Dell'Europa" (Gianna Nannini) – 3:34
"Avventuriera" (Nannini-Pianigiani/Nannini-Riva) – 4:04
"Bello E Impossibile" (Nannini-Pianigiani/Nannini) – 4:40 
"Bla Bla"  
"Vieni Ragazzo"  (Gianna Nannini-Parole / Gianna Nannini)
"Latin Lover" (Gianna Nannini - M. Paoluzzi/Gianna Nannini) - 4:35
"Fotoromanza" (Gianna Nannini - C. Blank/Gianna Nannini - R. Riva) – 4:27

External links
 Gianna Nannini homepage

1987 compilation albums
Gianna Nannini albums
Albums produced by Conny Plank
Italian-language albums